Cook Islanders are residents of the Cook Islands, which is composed of 15 islands and atolls in Polynesia in the Pacific Ocean. Cook Islands Māori are the indigenous Polynesian people of the Cook Islands, although more Cook Islands Māori currently reside in New Zealand than the Cook Islands. Originating from Tahitian settlers in the sixth century, the Cook Islands Māori bear cultural affinities with New Zealand Māori and Tahitian Mā'ohi, although they also exhibit a unique culture and developed their own language, which is currently recognized as one of two official languages in the Cook Islands, according to the Te Reo Maori Act of 2003.

Citizenship and nationality 

From a legal standpoint, there is no such thing as a Cook Islands citizenship. The Cook Islands is a self-governing country in free association with New Zealand and is part of the Realm of New Zealand. As such, Cook Islanders are New Zealand citizens.

The Cook Islands does not issue its own passports, a privilege usually assumed by virtually all sovereign countries, but places this responsibility in the hands of the New Zealand Government which issues passports for New Zealand citizens who are also Cook Islands nationals.

On the other hand, Cook Islands nationality is differentiated from that of the rest of the New Zealand citizens.

These provisions setting out qualifications for the status of a permanent resident of the Cook Islands are supplemented by other legislation to regulate the granting of permanent resident status to others, qualifications to be held by a permanent resident, and conditions under which that status may be withdrawn.

Ethnic groups
According to the most recent 2016 census, 78.2% of Cook Islanders are of Cook Island Māori descent, 7.62% are Part-Māori from the native Polynesian people of the islands and 14.18% other ethnic origins. Cook Islands Māori share many ancestral links with the Māori of New Zealand and the native people (Mā'ohi) of French Polynesia. Other Cook Islanders are also of Pacific Islander (primarily Polynesian), European (Papa'a), or Asian descent.
Results for the usual resident population.

Language
The official languages of the Cook Islands are English and Cook Islands Māori, an Eastern Polynesian language. Cook Islands Māori is closely related to New Zealand Māori, but is a distinct language in its own right. It is simply called "Māori" when there is no need to disambiguate it from New Zealand Māori, but it is also known as "Māori Kūki 'Āirani" or "Maori Kuki Airani".

Culture

Religious denomination
The religious distribution in the 2016 official census is as follows:
The various Protestant groups account for 62.8% of the believers, the most followed denomination being the Cook Islands Christian Church with 49.1% (down from 53% in 2006). Other Protestant Christian groups include Seventh-day Adventist 8.4%, Assemblies of God 3.8% Apostolic Church 2.1%. The main non-Protestant group is Roman Catholics with 17% of the population. While members of The Church of Jesus Christ of Latter-day Saints make up 4.4%. Only 2 per cent or 323 people refused or did not respond to this question.

See also 
 Cook Islands permanent residency
 Arrangement between US and the Compact of Free Association states

References

External links 
 The Cook Islands’ unique constitutional and international status; page 9

Cook Islanders
New Zealand nationality law
Māori